Westholme  may refer to:
Places
Westholme, British Columbia, a town in Canada
Westholme, Somerset, a settlement near Pilton, Somerset, England
Other
Westholme House, an historic building in Sleaford, England
Westholme School, a school in Blackburn, England